Jordan Binnington (born July 11, 1993) is a Canadian professional ice hockey goaltender for the St. Louis Blues of the National Hockey League (NHL).

Binnington was raised in Richmond Hill and Toronto.  He was drafted by the Blues in the third round, 88th overall in the 2011 NHL Entry Draft. He spent seven seasons in the minor leagues, with a brief call-up to the NHL in 2014 as an emergency goaltender. Binnington played for Canada in the 2013 IIHF World U20 Championship.

In December 2018, he was called up by the Blues and within a month became their starting goaltender.  His play helped the team improve from last place in the league to winning the 2019 Stanley Cup championship. He is the first NHL rookie goaltender to earn 16 wins in a single postseason, the maximum amount possible (not including the 2020 postseason, which included play-in games that enabled a goaltender to record more than 16 wins).

Playing career

Junior
Binnington played major junior hockey for the Owen Sound Attack in the Ontario Hockey League (OHL) from 2009 to 2013. Binnington had a very strong 2010–11 OHL season posting a 27–12–5 throughout 46 games. During the 2011 OHL Playoffs, Binnington led the Attack past the London Knights, the Plymouth Whalers, and the Windsor Spitfires to end up in the J. Ross Robertson Cup final versus the Mississauga St. Michael's Majors. The seven-game series was won by the Attack, with Jarrod Maidens scoring the series clinching goal in overtime. The Owen Sound Attack also competed in the 2011 Memorial Cup tournament as OHL champions.

Professional

St. Louis Blues
Ranked as the OHL's top 2011 NHL Entry Draft eligible goaltender (NHL Central Scouting Bureau's Final Rankings), he was selected with the 88th overall pick in the third round by the St. Louis Blues. Binnington signed a three-year entry level contract with the Blues on May 29, 2012. Playing one AHL game in 2011–12, he returned to Owen Sound for most of that season and also played with Owen Sound for 2012–13.

On November 26, 2014, Binnington was called up from the Kalamazoo Wings of the East Coast Hockey League, under emergency conditions, following the injury to Blues goaltender Brian Elliott. On January 14, 2016, he made his in-game debut against the Carolina Hurricanes, coming in to relieve starter Elliott in a 4–1 loss. On July 15, 2016, Binnington signed a one-year, two-way contract with the St. Louis Blues.

With the Blues playing the 2017–18 season without an AHL affiliate, Binnington was reassigned on loan to the Providence Bruins on October 9, 2017. He was not recalled to the NHL during the 2017–18 season, finishing with 17 wins in 28 games for the Bruins. He was named to the 2018 AHL All-Star Classic alongside teammate Austin Czarnik.

During the offseason before the 2018–19 season, Binnington signed a one-year, two-way contract with the Blues on July 6, 2018. Binnington was assigned to the St. Louis Blues AHL affiliate, the San Antonio Rampage, to begin the 2018–19 season.

He was recalled by the Blues to the NHL on December 9, 2018. The team had the worst record in the NHL on January 2. Five days later, Binnington made his first NHL start, making 25 saves in a 3–0 win over the Philadelphia Flyers and becoming the 35th NHL goaltender to earn a shutout in his first start. On February 11, Binnington was named the NHL First Star of the Week after going 3–0–0 to help the Blues to win six straight games and move into a Western Conference wild card spot. He was named the NHL Rookie of the Month in February and March 2019.

On April 4, 2019, a 7–3 victory over the Philadelphia Flyers gave Binnington his 23rd win of the season, a record for a Blues rookie goaltender.

On April 10, Binnington played his first NHL playoff game, stopping 25 of 26 shots against the Winnipeg Jets in a 2–1 victory. On April 27, Binnington was announced as a finalist for the Calder Memorial Trophy. After knocking out Winnipeg in six games, the Blues defeated the Dallas Stars in a seven-game conference semi-final series.

On May 19, 2019, Binnington became the first St. Louis Blues rookie goaltender to record a shutout in the Stanley Cup playoffs, a 5–0 win against the San Jose Sharks, which gave the Blues a team-record 11 playoff victories. The Blues defeated the Sharks in six games to advance to the 2019 Stanley Cup Finals where they met the Boston Bruins, the Eastern Conference champions. On June 12, the Blues defeated the Bruins in game seven to win the Stanley Cup, St. Louis' first in their 52-year franchise history. Binnington started every playoff game. With the Stanley Cup win, Binnington set an NHL record for most playoffs wins by a rookie goaltender in a single postseason, having won all 16 games needed to win the Stanley Cup.

In his Day with the Cup on July 12, Binnington brought the Stanley Cup to his hometown of Richmond Hill. The next day, the Blues re-signed Binnington to a two-year, $8.8 million contract extension. The following 2019–20 season was shortened by the onset of the COVID-19 pandemic, prematurely ending a strong season for the Blues that saw them win the Central Division and finish first in the Western Conference. Binnington recorded a 30–13–7 record and a .912 save percentage. The 2020 Stanley Cup playoffs were held later in the summer in a bubble environment in Canada. Binnington performed poorly in both the round robin phase and in the first round series against the Vancouver Canucks, losing all five of his starts and recording a .851 save percentage. Backup goaltender Jake Allen was noted for backstopping the team's only victories in the postseason.

With the pandemic continuing, the NHL temporarily realigned its format for the 2020–21 season, with all teams playing exclusively in their own divisions for the regular season. The Blues finished fourth in the new West Division, with Binnington compiling an 18–14–8 recording and a .910 save percentage overall, finishing the season with a particularly strong stretch of games in April and an .921 save percentage. Binnington's April success did not carry over into the 2021 Stanley Cup playoffs, where the Blues were swept by the Colorado Avalanche in the first round, with Binnington having only a .899 save percentage, his second consecutive sub-.900 in the postseason.

On March 11, 2021, the Blues had re-signed Binnington to a six-year, $36 million contract extension. With the division alignments and format returning to normal for the 2021–22 season, Binnington's struggles in net continued, and by the second half of the season he had been supplanted as the Blues' starting goaltender by Ville Husso. With Husso a free agent at the end of the season and Binnington's lengthy and expensive contract on the books, this generated speculation about the future of team goaltending. The Blues qualified for the 2022 Stanley Cup playoffs, entering the first round as underdogs against the Minnesota Wild, with Husso starting in net. However, with the Blues down 2–1 in the series, Binnington reclaimed the net starting with Game 4 and lead the team on a three-game winning streak to clinch the series. These were Binnington's first postseason wins since the 2019 Stanley Cup Finals, and he finished the series with a .943 save percentage. In the second round, the Blues entered another matchup against the Avalanche. Binnington's strong performances continued through the first two games, with the series tied 1–1 heading back to St. Louis. Midway through the first period of Game 3, Binnington was injured when Avalanche forward Nazem Kadri and Blues defenceman Calle Rosén crashed into him, and was forced to leave the game. With Husso returning to the net, the Blues lost. Blues coach Craig Berube, when asked about the incident, said only "look at Kadri's reputation. That's all I've got to say." Kadri denied that he had intended to injure Binnington by making the play. Binnington was alleged by Kadri to have hurled a water bottle at him during an on camera interview after the game. At the time of his departure, Binnington had stopped 167 of 176 shots faced over six games and a .949 save percentage. The Blues later confirmed that Binnington would miss the remainder of the playoffs.

On December 12, 2022, Binnington won his 100th game in a 1–0 shutout against the Nashville Predators, making him the sixth goaltender in franchise history to earn 100 victories with the club.

On March 15, 2023, Binnington punched Minnesota Wild player Ryan Hartman following a goal. Binnington was ejected from the game, and the NHL suspended him for two games following the incident.

Career statistics

Regular season and playoffs

International

Awards and honours

NHL record
 Most wins in a single playoff season by a rookie goaltender, 16 (2018-19)

References

External links

 

1993 births
Canadian ice hockey goaltenders
Chicago Wolves players
Kalamazoo Wings (ECHL) players
Ice hockey people from Ontario
Living people
Owen Sound Attack players
Peoria Rivermen (AHL) players
Providence Bruins players
Sportspeople from Richmond Hill, Ontario
St. Louis Blues draft picks
St. Louis Blues players
Stanley Cup champions